"Post Marked Stamps No. 4" is a split EP between Kansas City, Missouri band The Get Up Kids and Chicago, Illinois group Braid. The album is the fourth in the "Post Marked Stamps" series, a set of nine split EPs between various bands put out by Tree Records in 1997. There were 2 different pressings of the album; One distributed in the United States, and another sold in Europe during the band's joint European tour. Each song was recorded separately, with "I'm a Loner Dottie, a Rebel" recorded at Red House Studios in Eudora, Kansas, and "Forever Got Shorter" recorded at Private Studios in Urbana, Illinois. The set included a sealed envelope that contained three postcards; One postcard for each song, including recording information and lyrics, and a third featuring poetry by Vigue Martin.

Track listing

Additional releases
The Get Up Kids re-released this version of "I'm a Loner Dottie, a Rebel" on their B-Sides collection Eudora, however, for unknown reasons cut out some of the opening drums. They also re-recorded the song for their second full-length studio album Something to Write Home About.
Braid re-released "Forever Got Shorter" on the "Movie Music, Vol. 1" collection. The song is also included on their live album "Lucky to Be Alive".
Tree Records released the entire Post Marked Stamps series on Compact Disc in 1999.

Personnel
The Get Up Kids
Matt Pryor - Vocals, Guitar
Jim Suptic - Guitar, Backing Vocals
Rob Pope - Bass
Ryan Pope - Drums

Braid
Bob Nanna - Vocals, Guitar
Todd Bell - Bass
Chris Broach - Vocals, Guitar
Roy Ewing - Drums

References

The Get Up Kids EPs
Braid (band) albums
Split EPs
1997 EPs